Stephen Hallett Hammond (November 14, 1828 in Groton, Tompkins County, New York – March 9, 1910 in Geneva, Ontario County, New York) was an American lawyer and politician from New York.

Life
He was the son of Clark Hammond. He attended the common schools and Ithaca Academy, and graduated from Geneva College in 1854. While in college, he also studied law, and was admitted to the bar. In 1856, he married Lucy Wadsworth Langdon (1835–1895), and they had one daughter.

While his uncle Elbridge G. Spaulding was state treasurer from 1854 to 1855, Hammond did some work for the Treasury. In 1856, he was appointed Deputy New York Attorney General and held the post por 16 years.

He was a member of the New York State Assembly (Ontario Co., 1st D.) in 1874 and 1875, and was chairman of the Committee on Ways and Means in 1875.

He was a member of the New York State Senate (26th D.) in 1876 and 1877.

Later he was Chairman of the Board of Managers of the Willard Asylum for the Chronic Insane.

Sources
 Life Skeches of Government Officers and Members of the Legislature of the State of New York in 1875 by W. H. McElroy and Alexander McBride (pg. 193ff)
 General Catalog of Hobart College
 The funeral of Mrs. S. H. Hammond... transcribed from the Geneva Daily Times on July 19, 1895
 CHARGES AGAINST DR. MACY in NYT on February 8, 1901
 Obituary Notes; STEPHEN H. HAMMOND... in NYT on March 10, 1910

1828 births
1910 deaths
Democratic Party New York (state) state senators
Politicians from Geneva, New York
Democratic Party members of the New York State Assembly
Hobart and William Smith Colleges alumni
People from Groton, New York
19th-century American politicians